Turhan Yılmaz (born 11 September 1958) is a Turkish chess player. He is five-time Turkish Chess Champion.

Biography 
Yılmaz earned FIDE title, International Master (IM) in 1986. He won the 1978, 1979, 1986, 1989 and 2004 Turkish Chess Championships. As a national player, he took part in the 26th, 27th, 28th, 29th, 30th, 32nd, 33rd and 36th Chess Olympiad.

His sisters Gülümser Öney and Gülsevil Yılmaz also became Turkish Women's Chess Champion.

Achievements 
 1978 Turkish Chess Championship – Champion
 1979 Turkish Chess Championship – Champion
 1986 Turkish Chess Championship – Champion
 1989 Turkish Chess Championship – Champion
 2004 Turkish Chess Championship – Champion

References

External links 
 
 

1958 births
Living people
Turkish chess players
Chess International Masters
Chess Olympiad competitors